Maksym Zhychykov (born 7 November 1992) is a Ukrainian football defender who plays for Metalist 1925 Kharkiv. Besides Ukraine, he has played in Lithuania and Finland.

Career
Zhychykov is a product of the UFK Kharkiv youth sportive school. He signed a contract with FC Shakhtar in 2009. During 2013-2014 he was on loan for the Ukrainian Premier League club FC Zorya, but did not spend any game in the main-team squad. From July 2014 was on loan in FC Sumy. And from July 2016 plays on loan in FC Oleksandriya.

References

External links 

Ukrainian footballers
Ukrainian expatriate footballers
FC Shakhtar Donetsk players
PFC Sumy players
Association football defenders
People from Krasnopavlivka, Kharkiv Oblast
1992 births
Living people
FC Zorya Luhansk players
FC Mariupol players
Ukrainian Premier League players
Ukrainian First League players
FC Oleksandriya players
Ukraine youth international footballers
Ukraine under-21 international footballers
MFC Mykolaiv players
FC Poltava players
Kokkolan Palloveikot players
Veikkausliiga players
FC Arsenal Kyiv players
FC Mynai players
FC Metalist 1925 Kharkiv players
Sportspeople from Kharkiv Oblast